Nick Travis (November 16, 1925, in Philadelphia, Pennsylvania – October 7, 1964, in New York City) was an American jazz trumpeter. 

Travis started playing professionally at age 15, playing in the early 1940s with Johnny McGhee, Vido Musso (1942), Mitchell Ayres, and Woody Herman (1942–44). In 1944 he joined the military; after his service he played with Ray McKinley (1946–50, intermittent), Benny Goodman (1948–49), Gene Krupa, Ina Ray Hutton, Tommy Dorsey, Tex Beneke, Herman once more (1950–51), Jerry Gray, Bob Chester, Elliot Lawrence, and Jimmy Dorsey (1952–53). From 1953-56 he was a soloist in the Sauter-Finegan Orchestra. After this he became a session musician for NBC, but played with Gerry Mulligan (1960–62) and Thelonious Monk (1963, at Lincoln Center).

Most of Travis's work was in big bands, but he also played in small ensembles with Al Cohn (1953) and Zoot Sims (1956). He led one session for Victor Records in 1954.

In 1964, Travis died at age 38 as a result of complications from ulcers.

Discography
With Bob Brookmeyer
Brookmeyer (Vik, 1956)
Jazz Concerto Grosso (ABC-Paramount, 1957) with Gerry Mulligan and Phil Sunkel 
Portrait of the Artist (Atlantic, 1960)
Gloomy Sunday and Other Bright Moments (Verve, 1961)
With Al Cohn
Al Cohn's Tones (Savoy, 1953 [1956])
Four Brass One Tenor (RCA Victor, 1955)
Son of Drum Suite (RCA Victor, 1960)
With Art Farmer
The Aztec Suite (United Artists, 1959)
With Dizzy Gillespie
Carnegie Hall Concert (Verve, 1961)
Perceptions (Verve, 1961)
With Benny Golson
 Take a Number from 1 to 10 (Argo, 1961)
With Jimmy Giuffre
The Music Man (Atlantic, 1958)
With Urbie Green
All About Urbie Green and His Big Band (ABC-Paramount, 1956)
With Coleman Hawkins
The Hawk in Hi Fi (RCA Victor, 1956)
The Hawk in Paris (Vik, 1956)
With Quincy Jones
The Great Wide World of Quincy Jones (Mercury, 1959)
With John Lewis
Essence (Atlantic, 1962)
With Gerry Mulligan
The Concert Jazz Band (Verve, 1960)
Gerry Mulligan and the Concert Jazz Band on Tour (Verve, 1960 [1962])
Gerry Mulligan and the Concert Jazz Band at the Village Vanguard (Verve, 1960 [1961])
Holliday with Mulligan (DRG, 1961 [1980]) with Judy Holliday
Gerry Mulligan Presents a Concert in Jazz (Verve, 1961)
Gerry Mulligan '63 (Verve, 1963)
With Mark Murphy
That's How I Love the Blues! (Riverside, 1962)
With Joe Newman
Salute to Satch (RCA Victor, 1956)
With Zoot Sims
Zoot! (Riverside, 1956)
With Own Quintet
The Panic Is On! (Hallmark, 1990)

References
Scott Yanow, [ Nick Travis] at Allmusic

1925 births
1964 deaths
American jazz trumpeters
American male trumpeters
Musicians from Philadelphia
20th-century American musicians
20th-century trumpeters
Jazz musicians from Pennsylvania
20th-century American male musicians
American male jazz musicians
Orchestra U.S.A. members